Xihu Township or Sihu Township is an urban township in the middle of Changhua County, Taiwan.

A traditional farming village, along with Xiluo, Xihu is one of the centers of vegetable-growing on the western side of the island. Famous local foods include lamb hotpot and kyoho grapes.

Geography
The area of Xihu township is 32.0592 km2. As of January 2023, its population was 54,098, including 27,366 males and 26,732 females.

Administrative divisions
The township comprises 25 villages, which are Beishi, Biantou, Dating, Datu, Dazhu, Dingzhuang, Guanghua, Guangping, Hetung, Hutung, Huxi, Macuo, Nande, Panpo, Pinghe, Taiping, Tianzhong, Tungliao, Tungxi Village.Xiliao, Xishi, Xixi, Zhongjiao, Zhongshan and Zhongzhu.

Education
The township has one senior high school (溪湖高中), two middle schools (溪湖國中, 成功國中) and five elementary schools (湖東國小, 湖西國小, 湖南國小, 湖北國小, 溪湖國小).

Tourist attractions

During Japanese rule, Xihu was an important center for sugar manufacturing. Because of the demand for sugar transport, a railway system was set up. At the former Xihu Sugar Factory, a tourist train featuring 60-year-old steam engine continues to operate. The locomotive is Taiwan's first unmodified steam engine, Engine No. 346.

Transportation

Xihu Bus Station is served by Yuanlin Bus.

References

External links

 
  

Townships in Changhua County